"One Mississippi" is a song recorded by American country music singer Kane Brown. It was released on August 20, 2021, as the lead single from Brown's third studio album Different Man. The song was co-written by Brown, Ernest K. Smith, Jesse Frasure and Levon Gray, and produced by Dann Huff.

Background
In 2021, Brown signed a new writer, Levon Gray. It marks the first work between them.

He told to Country Now, said: "Gray tagged me in a post, and two other people, and I was the only artist who got back to him. I thought he could sing. And the song [in the post], he had written himself. I had just started my publishing company, so I was like, ‘I wanna give this guy a chance.’"

Content
In an interview with The Nashville Soundbite , Brown pointed the song covered a relationship about "where you makeup and you break up, and you just keep running into each other, and then something about that spark in the relationship gets y’all back together and may fall apart again."

Music video
The music video was released on August 20, 2021, and directed by Alex Alvga. It includes actor Ross Butler. The video features as "the story of a lovestruck pair, with Brown appearing against dramatic staging in a rural setting."

Live performance
On August 24, 2021, Brown performed the song at Jimmy Kimmel Live!.

Charts

Weekly charts

Year-end charts

Certifications

Release history

References

2021 singles
2021 songs
Kane Brown songs
Songs written by Kane Brown
Songs written by Jesse Frasure
Song recordings produced by Dann Huff
Songs written by Ernest (musician)
RCA Records Nashville singles